Chapel Hart is an American country music vocal group from Poplarville, Mississippi. The group consists of sisters Danica Hart and Devynn Hart, and their cousin Trea Swindle, all three of whom are vocalists. The group has independently released two studio albums and seven singles. In July 2022, they competed in the seventeenth season of America's Got Talent, where they finished fifth.

Music career
Sisters Danica and Devynn Hart began singing together in 2014 with their cousin Trea Swindle. The three started busking by performing cover songs on the streets of New Orleans and eventually writing original songs as well. Danica Hart and Swindle began recording in 2016 under the name Hyperphlyy, and released the EP Made for Me (2016). They released the album Out the Mud in 2019, which featured Devynn, and was credited as Hyperphlyy. The trio also performed at music festivals around Louisiana, and in Innsbruck, Austria. They renamed themselves Chapel Hart, taking the name from a church in their hometown.

In 2020, they were discovered by record producer Jeff Glixman, who is their manager and producer. This was followed by a standalone single titled "Jesus & Alcohol" in 2020, which featured ZZ Top member Billy Gibbons on guitar. They also shot a music video for the song, in which Gibbons plays the role of a pastor. T. Graham Brown and Deborah Allen also make cameos in the video, which aired on CMT after its release. Additionally, they sang background vocals on LeRoux's album One of Those Days in 2020.

CMT selected Chapel Hart as one of several artists for their 2021 "Next Women of Country" campaign, which promotes new and upcoming female country music artists. This was followed in 2021 by the group's second single, "I Will Follow". A music video was produced for the song, which aired on CMT, with Jackyl frontman Jesse James Dupree making a cameo appearance in it. Jennifer Hanson wrote the song with Savannah Keyes and Nick Brophy, the latter of whom co-produced it with Glixman. The corresponding music video began airing on CMT on February 5, 2021. Kevin John Coyne of Country Universe rated the song "A", praising the group members' singing voices while comparing the arrangement favorably to the works of SHeDAISY and The Chicks. A third single and video, "You Can Have Him Jolene", followed in March 2021. The song is an answer song to Dolly Parton's "Jolene".

In July 2021, the group announced a second studio album, titled The Girls Are Back in Town. Glixman also produced this album. Another single and video, "Made for Me", followed in 2022. Chapel Hart had planned to tour with the Indigo Girls in mid-2022, but canceled this tour when that duo's member Emily Saliers was diagnosed with COVID-19.

During this time, agents for the NBC talent show America's Got Talent contacted members of the group. Danica told the blog Taste of Country that Chapel Hart initially turned down the offer, but ultimately agreed to appear on the show after being contacted by the same agent a number of times. On the audition episode airing July 19 (during the show's 17th season), they performed "You Can Have Him Jolene". For the second time in the show's history, a group Golden Buzzer was granted to them by the four judges and host. This allowed Chapel Hart to advance to the next round of competition, eventually earning a spot in the finals after performing their original song "The Girls Are Back in Town". Chapel Hart advanced to the finals, where they performed a cover of Bonnie Raitt's "Something to Talk About" with Darius Rucker. They were eliminated from the fifth-place position.

Chapel Hart received an invitation to make their debut on the Grand Ole Opry on September 17, 2022. They are also featured on Darius Rucker's late-2022 single "Ol' Church Hymn". In late October 2022, Danica Hart underwent vocal cord surgery, requiring a period of vocal rest. Once Danica recovered, the trio released a new single titled "Glory Days" in January 2023. They also released another song titled "Welcome to Fist City", an answer song to Loretta Lynn's 1968 single "Fist City". Prior to her death in 2022, Lynn had asked the trio to write the song. Chapel Hart also announced a series of tour dates for 2023.

Musical influences and style 
In 2020, Danica told the Houston Chronicle that she was influenced by albums from George Strait and Kenny Rogers. She and Devynn have also cited Gretchen Wilson as a primary musical influence. Joey Guerra of the Houston Chronicle noted that Chapel Hart's sound is heavily reliant on their use of vocal harmony. He also found Danica's voice comparable to that of Etta James, while also finding influences of a "classic girl group" sound on other songs. Later in 2020, Swindle told American Songwriter that she was aware of the unusual choice for an African American act to record country music, telling the publication: "You don’t really choose [country music]. It was how we grew up and who we are."

Discography

Studio albums

Extended plays

Singles

Music videos

Notes

References

African-American country musicians
African-American musical groups
America's Got Talent contestants
Country music groups from Mississippi
Family musical groups
Vocal trios
2014 establishments in Mississippi
Musical groups established in 2014